Abbasabad (also Romanized as ‘Abbāsābād) is a village in Fuladlui Jonubi Rural District, Hir District, Ardabil County, Ardabil Province, Iran. At the 2006 census, its population was 145, in 24 families.

References 

Towns and villages in Ardabil County